Nazi Germany operated around 1,000 prisoner-of-war camps during World War II (1939-1945).

Germany had signed the Third Geneva Convention of 1929, which established provisions relating to the treatment of prisoners of war.
 Article 10 required that PoWs should be lodged in adequately heated and lighted buildings where conditions were the same as for German troops.
 Articles 27-32 detailed the conditions of labour. Enlisted ranks were required to perform whatever labour they were asked if able to do, so long as it was not dangerous and did not support the German war-effort. Senior Non-commissioned officers (sergeants and above) were required to work only in a supervisory role. Commissioned officers were not required to work, although they could volunteer. The work performed was largely agricultural or industrial, ranging from coal- or potash-mining, stone quarrying, or work in saw mills, breweries, factories, railroad yards, and forests. PoWs hired out to military and civilian contractors were supposed to receive pay. The workers were also supposed to get at least one day a week of rest.
 Article 76 ensured that PoWs who died in captivity were honourably buried in marked graves.

Types of Camps 

 Dulag or Durchgangslager (transit camp) – These camps served as a collection point for POWs prior to reassignment. These camps were intelligence collection centers.
 Dulag Luft or Durchgangslager der Luftwaffe (transit camp of the Luftwaffe) – These were transit camps for Air Force POWs.  The main Dulag Luft camp at Frankfurt was the principal collecting point for intelligence derived from Allied POW interrogation
Heilag or Heimkehrerlager (repatriation camps) - Camps for the return of prisoners.  Quite often these men had suffered disabling injuries. 
 Ilag/Jlag or Internierungslager ("Internment camp") – These were civilian internment camps.
 Marlag or Marine-Lager ("Marine camp") – These were Navy personnel POW camps.
 Milag or Marine-Internierten-Lager ("Marine internment camp") – These were merchant seamen internment camps.
 Oflag or Offizier-Lager ("Officer camp") – These were POW camps for officers.
 Stalag or Stammlager ("Base camp") – These were enlisted personnel POW camps.
 Stalag Luft or Luftwaffe-Stammlager  ("Luftwaffe base camp") – These were POW camps administered by the German Air Force for Allied aircrews.

Nomenclature 
At the start of World War II, the German Army was divided into 17 military districts (Wehrkreis), which were each assigned Roman numerals. The camps were numbered according to the military district. A letter behind the Roman number marked individual Stalags in a military district.

e.g.
Stalag II-D was the fourth Stalag in Military District II (Wehrkreis II).

Sub-camps had a suffix "/Z" (for Zweiglager - sub-camp).  The main camp had a suffix of "/H" (for Hauptlager - main camp).

e.g.
Oflag VII-C/H meant this is the main camp.
Oflag VII-C/Z meant this is a sub-camp of a main camp.

Some of these sub-camps were not the traditional POW camps with barbed wire fences and guard towers, but merely accommodation centers.

List of Camps by Military District

Military District I (Königsberg) 
 Stalag I-A Stablack, Preußisch Eylau
 Stalag I-B Hohenstein
 Stalag I-C, from June 1943: Stalag Luft VI, Heydekrug
 Stalag I-D Montwy
 Stalag I-E Prostken
 Stalag I-F Sudauen

Military District II (Stettin) 
 Stalag II-A Neubrandenburg
 Stalag II-B Hammerstein–Schlochau
 Stalag II-C Greifswald
 Stalag II-D Stargard
 Stalag II-E Schwerin
 Stalag II H Raderitz
 Oflag II-A Prenzlau
 Oflag II-B Arnswalde
 Oflag II-C Woldenberg
 Oflag II-D Gross Born
 Oflag II-E Neubrandenburg

Military District III (Berlin) 
 Stalag III-A Luckenwalde
 Stalag III-B Fürstenberg/Oder
 Stalag III-C Alt-Drewitz
 Stalag III-D Berlin
 Oflag III-A Luckenwalde
 Oflag III-B Wehrmachtlager Tibor/Zuellichau
 Oflag III-C Lübben/Spree

Military District IV (Dresden) 
 Stalag IV-A Elsterhorst
 Stalag IV-B Mühlberg (Elbe)
 Stalag IV-C Wistritz bei Teplitz
 Stalag IV-D Torgau
 Stalag IV-E Altenburg
 Stalag IV-F Hartmannsdorf
 Stalag IV-G Oschatz
 Oflag IV-A Hohnstein
 Oflag IV-B Koenigstein
 Oflag IV-C Colditz Castle
 Oflag IV-D Elsterhorst

Military District V (Stuttgart) 
 Stalag V-A Ludwigsburg
 Stalag V-B Villingen
 Stalag V-C Wildberg
 Stalag V-D Strasbourg
 Oflag V-A Weinsberg
 Oflag V-B Biberach
 Oflag V-C Wurzach

Military District VI (Münster) 
 Stalag VI-A Hemer/Iserlohn
 Stalag VI-B Neu-Versen
 Stalag VI-C Oberlangen/Emsland
 Stalag VI-D Dortmund
 Stalag VI-F Bocholt
 Stalag VI-G Bonn–Duisdorf
 Stalag VI-H Arnoldsweiler/Dueren
 Stalag VI-J S.A. Lager Fichtenhein/Krefeld and Dorsten
 Stalag VI-K Stukenbrock
 Oflag VI-A Soest
 Oflag VI-B Doessel–Warburg
 Oflag VI-C Eversheide/Osnabrück
 Oflag VI-D Münster
 Oflag VI-E Dorsten

Military District VII (Munich) 
 Stalag VII-A Moosburg
 Stalag VII-B Memmingen
 Oflag VII Laufen
 Oflag VII-A Murnau am Staffelsee
 Oflag VII-B Eichstaett
 Oflag VII-C Laufen
 Oflag VII-D Tittmoning

Military District VIII (Breslau) 
 Stalag VIII-A Görlitz
 Stalag VIII-B Lamsdorf
 Stalag VIII-C Sagan
 Stalag VIII-D Teschen
 Stalag VIII-E/308 Neuhammer
 Stalag VIII-F Lamsdorf
 Oflag VIII-A Kreuzburg/Oppeln
 Oflag VIII-B Silberberg
 Oflag VIII-C Juliusburg
 Oflag VIII-D/Tittmoning Castle
 Oflag VIII-E Johannisbrunn
 Oflag VIII-F Mährisch-Trübau
 Oflag VIII-G Weidenau/Freiwaldau
 Oflag VIII-H/H Oberlangendorf/Sternberg
 Oflag VIII-H/Z Eulenberg/Roemerstadt

Military District IX (Kassel) 
 Stalag IX-A Ziegenhain
 Stalag IX-B Wegscheide/Bad Orb
 Stalag IX-C Bad Sulza
 Oflag IX-A/H Burg Spangenberg
 Oflag IX-A/Z Rotenburg/Fulda
 Oflag IX-B Weilburg/Lahn
 Oflag IX-C Molsdorf near Erfurt

Military District X (Hamburger) 
 Stalag X-A Schleswig
 Stalag X-B Sandbostel
 Stalag X-C Nienburg/Weser
 Oflag X Hohensalza
 Oflag X-A Itzehoe
 Oflag X-B Nienburg/Weser
 Oflag X-C Lübeck
 Oflag X-D Fischbek

Military District XI (Hanover) 
 Stalag XI-A Altengrabow
 Stalag XI-B Fallingbostel
 Stalag XI-C Bergen-Belsen
 Stalag XI-D Oerbke
 Oflag XI-A Osterode am Harz

Military District XII (Wiesbaden) 
 Stalag XII-A Limburg an der Lahn
 Stalag XII-B Frankenthal/Palatinate
 Stalag XII-C Wiebelsheim/Rhein
 Stalag XII-D Trier/Petrisberg (Trèves)
 Stalag XII-E Metz
 Stalag XII-F Forbach
 Oflag XII-A Hadamar/Limburg an der Lahn
 Oflag XII-B Mainz

Military District XIII (Nuremberg) 
 Stalag XIII-A Sulzbach-Rosenberg, Oberpfalz
 Stalag XIII-B Weiden/Oberpfalz
 Stalag XIII-C Hammelburg/Mainfranken
 Stalag XIII-D Nuremberg-Langwasser
 Oflag XIII-A Nuremberg-Langwasser
 Oflag XIII-B Hammelburg
 Oflag XIII-D Nuremberg-Langwasser

Military District XVII (Vienna) 

 Stalag XVII-A Kaisersteinbruch
 Stalag XVII-B Krems–Gneixendorf. Formerly named Dulag Gneixendorf
 Stalag XVII-C Döllersheim. Previously named Dulag Döllersheim
 Stalag XVII-D Pupping. Previously named Zweiglager Pupping, renamed Stalag 237,  Stalag 397, and finally Stalag 398 Pupping
 Oflag XVII-A Edelbach

Military District XVIII (Salzburg) 
 Stalag XVIII-A Wolfsberg
 Stalag XVIII-A/Z Spittal
 Stalag XVIII-B Oberdrauburg
 Stalag XVIII-C Markt Pongau
 Stalag XVIII-D Maribor
 Oflag XVIII-A Lienz/Drau
 Oflag XVIII-B Wolfsberg/Kaernten
 Oflag XVIII-C Spittal/Drau

Military District XX (Danzig) 
 Stalag XX-A Thorn (Poland) 
 Stalag 312 (also known as Stalag XX-C) Thorn (Poland) Same as above
 Stalag XX-B Marienburg (Poland)

Military District XXI (Posen) 
 Stalag XXI-A Schildberg  (Poland)
 Stalag XXI-B Schubin  (Poland)
 Stalag XXI-B Thure  (Poland)
 Stalag XXI-C/H Wollstein  (Poland)
 Stalag XXI-C/Z Graetz
 Stalag XXI-D Posen  (Poland)
 Oflag XXI-A Schokken (Poland)
 Oflag XXI-B Schoken  (Poland)
 Oflag XXI-C Schubin/Schokken/Schildberg   (Poland)
 Oflag XXI-C/Z Grune bei Lissa (Poland)

Other Camps 
 Oflag 6 Tost (Poland)
 Oflag 53 Pagėgiai (Lithuania)
 Oflag 60 Širvintos (Lithuania)
 Oflag 64 Schubin
 Oflag 79 Waggum, Braunschweig
 Stalag 56 Prostken (Poland)
 Stalag 133 Rennes (France)
 Stalag 302 Gross-Born
 Stalag 307 Biała Podlaska (Poland)
 Stalag 307 Dęblin (Poland)
 Stalag 313 Czarne (Poland)
 Stalag 315 Przemyśl (Poland)
 Stalag 319 Chełm (Poland)
 Stalag 323 Gross-Born
 Stalag 324 Grodno (Belarus)
 Stalag 325 Zamość (Poland)
 Stalag 325 Rawa Ruska (Poland)
 Stalag 327 Jarosław (Poland)
 Stalag 328 Lemberg (Poland)
 Stalag 329 Winniza (Ukraine)
 Stalag 333 Ostrów-Komorowo (Poland)
 Stalag 336 Kaunas (Lithuania)
 Stalag 339 Kyiv-Darniza (Ukraine)
 Stalag 342 Maladetschna (Belarus)
 Stalag 343 Alytus (Lithuania)
 Stalag 344 Vilnius (Lithuania)
 Stalag 351 Berkenbrugge
 Stalag 355 Khmelnytskyi Ukraine
 Stalag 357 Kopernikus (Poland)
 Stalag 359 Poniatowa (Poland)
 Stalag 361 Šiauliai (Lithuania)
 Stalag 366 Siedlce (Poland)
 Stalag 367 Częstochowa (Poland)
 Stalag 369 Krakau (Poland)
 Stalag 369 Kobierzyn (Poland)
 Stalag 371 Stanislau (Poland)
 Stalag XX-A (301) Friesack, Wutzetz/Brandenburg, (Germany)

Luftwaffe Camps 
The camps for Allied airmen were run by the Luftwaffe independently of the Army.
 Dulag Luft Oberursel, Frankfurt
 Stalag Luft I Barth 
 Stalag Luft II Litzmannstadt (Poland)
 Stalag Luft III Sagan 
 Stalag Luft IV Groß Tychow (Poland) 
 Stalag Luft V Halle/Saale
 Stalag Luft VI Heydekrug
 Stalag Luft VII Bankau
 Stalag Luft VIII-B Lamsdorf
 Stalag Luft XI-B

Kriegsmarine Camps 
The camp for Allied seamen was run by the Kriegsmarine independently of the Army.
 Marlag und Milag Nord Westertimke

References

External links
 Map of German World War II Prisoner of War Camps
 Lamsdorf Remembered
 POW Camp Listings
 Stoker Harold Siddall Royal Navy, captured on Crete and his life in Stalag VIIA
 The Memorial of Esterwegen - The Emsland Camps
 Oflag VC Wurzach / Ilag (Civil internees from Jersey)
 Stalag VIIIC and Stalag Luft 3 POW Camps Museum in Zagan, Poland
 Official list of World War II Stalags 
 Official list of World War II Oflags 
 List of Nazi camps for Allied POWs in Germany and occupied territories

Further reading
 Nichol, John. The Last Escape.  (The suffering of Allied POWs in the last months of the war.)
 Bernd Faulenbach, Andrea Kaltofen (Hg.): 'Hölle im Moor'. Die Emslandlager 1933–1945. Wallstein, Göttingen 2017, .

Pow
Military of Nazi Germany
Germany
Prisoner of war camps